A list of films produced by the Tollywood (Bengali language film industry) based in Kolkata in the year 1995.

Highest-grossing
Sangharsha

A-Z of films

References

External links
 Tollywood films of 1995 at the Internet Movie Database

1995
Bengali
1995 films
1995 in Indian cinema
 Bengali films